Lupinus andersonii is a species of lupine known by the common name Anderson's lupine.

Description 
It is native to California and adjacent sections of Oregon and Nevada, where it grows in dry mountain habitat of various types. This lupine is similar to Lupinus albicaulis in appearance. It is a hairy, erect perennial herb growing 20 to 90 centimeters in height. Each palmate leaf is made up of 6 to 9 leaflets each up to 6 centimeters long. The inflorescence is up to 23 centimeters long, bearing whorls of flowers each roughly a centimeter long. The flower is purple to yellowish or whitish in color. The fruit is a silky-hairy legume pod up to 4.5 centimeters long containing several seeds.  It was named after Charles Lewis Anderson by Sereno Watson.

References

External links
Jepson Manual Treatment
Photo gallery

andersonii
Flora of California
Flora of Oregon
Flora of Nevada
Flora without expected TNC conservation status